Patrick Henry McCarren (July 8, 1849 in East Cambridge, Massachusetts – October 23, 1909 in Brooklyn, New York City) was an American politician from New York.

Life
The family removed to Brooklyn when Patrick was still a child. He attended Public School Nr. 17 in Brooklyn. Then he became a cooper, and later an oil inspector. He married Kate Hogan (died 1883), a school teacher, and they had five children who all died in infancy.

He was a member of the New York State Assembly (Kings Co., 6th D.) in 1882 and 1883. Then he studied law, and was admitted to the bar, but did not open a law office, and very rarely appeared in court.

He was again a member of the State Assembly in 1889; and a member of the New York State Senate (4th D.) from 1890 to 1893, sitting in the 113th, 114th, 115th and 116th New York State Legislatures.

He was again a member of the State Senate (7th D.) from 1896 until his death in 1909, sitting in the 119th, 120th, 121st, 122nd, 123rd, 124th, 125th, 126th, 127th, 128th, 129th, 130th, 131st and 132nd New York State Legislatures.

In 1900 he proposed another bridge across the East River, between the existing Brooklyn Bridge and Manhattan Bridge.

McCarren was considered the Boss of Brooklyn's Democratic organization by 1909, and Brookyln's Democrats were known for guarding their independence from that of Tammany Hall in Manhattan. Their motto under McCarren was, "The Tiger Shall Not Cross The Bridge".

Patrick McCarren owned and raced Thoroughbred horses.

He died on October 23, 1909, in St. Catherine's Hospital, in Williamsburg, Brooklyn.

Greenpoint Park in Brooklyn was renamed McCarren Park in his honor.

Sources

 The New York Red Book compiled by Edgar L. Murlin (published by James B. Lyon, Albany NY, 1897; pg. 160f, 403f, 501f and 507)
 M'CARREN IS DEAD in NYT on October 23, 1909

1849 births
1909 deaths
Democratic Party New York (state) state senators
American racehorse owners and breeders
People from Brooklyn
Democratic Party members of the New York State Assembly
19th-century American politicians